The (Japanese) Lunar Exploration Program (月探査計画) is a program of robotic and human missions to the Moon undertaken by the Japanese Aerospace Exploration Agency (JAXA) and its division, the Institute of Space and Astronautical Science (ISAS). It is also one of the three major enterprises of the JAXA Space Exploration Center (JSPEC). The main goal of the program is "to elucidate the origin and evolution of the Moon and utilize the Moon in the future".

The first spacecraft of the program, the uncrewed lunar orbiter SELENE (Kaguya), was launched from Tanegashima Space Center on September 14, 2007, after being delayed several times. SELENE-2, Japan's first lunar lander and rover, was expected to be launched in the 2020s, but the mission was canceled in March 2015. The program also included a lunar sample return mission (SELENE-3), a mission to Mars to collect data for future crewed expeditions (MELOS), participation in the Mars international sample return mission, and an advanced lander for future human missions to the Moon. The eventual goal is to participate in an international lunar outpost program, in which Japanese crews would stay on the lunar surface for a prolonged period of time and promote scientific research and environment utilization.

Completed missions

SELENE (Kaguya)

SELENE (Selenological and Engineering Explorer), nicknamed Kaguya after a lunar princess in the ancient Japanese folklore The Tale of the Bamboo Cutter, is the second Japanese mission to the Moon. Launched in September 2007, it was "the largest lunar mission since the Apollo program". The mission featured three separate space craft, the main orbiter (Kaguya), the small relay satellite (Okina), and the VLBI satellite (Ouna).

Cancelled missions

SELENE-2

SELENE-2, also known as Kaguya-2, formerly known as SELENE-B, would have been the follow-on mission to Kaguya. SELENE-2 would have consisted of one large lander, which would have a small-sized rover, and if possible,
would also have some penetrators inherited from the LUNAR-A mission, and a small data relay satellite. In March 2015, JAXA cancelled the SELENE-2 mission.

SELENE-3

SELENE-3 aimed to return about 100 grams of samples from the Moon's surface. It would have been launched around 2020. However, due to financial issues, this mission was considered for merging into the option-3 of SELENE-X.

SELENE-X

SELENE-X would have been launched in the late 2010s, in view of Japan's participation in Humans Lunar Activities foreseen. The SELENE-X may perform either of the following demonstrations:

Option-1:Technology demonstration for building outposts such as the excavation for construction of Infrastructures.
Option-2: Logistics capability demonstration for building common landers for both transportation and JAXA's own robotic missions.
Option-3: Highly sophisticated in-situ robotic lander, or returning samples of the surface soil to the Earth, including the development of high speed reentry capsules.

There are other options under study, and will be determined after the international exploration strategy has been clarified.

Planned missions

MELOS

MELOS (Mars Exploration with Lander-Orbiter Synergy) is a planned mission to Mars, consisting of an orbiter (MELOS-1), and a lander (MELOS-2). It would be the successor to the comet probe Suisei (PLANET-A) the Mars probe Nozomi (PLANET-B), and the Venus probe Akatsuki (PLANET-C). MELOS-1 was planned to be launched in 2018, and would also have up to four small landers.

Related missions

Hiten (MUSES-A)

Hiten, or MUSES-A (Mu Space Engineering Satellite-A) is a technology demonstration satellite built by ISAS, launched on January 24, 1990.

LUNAR-A

LUNAR-A was an ISAS mission consisting of a lunar space craft which would have carried two penetrators to the Moon, and deploy them at an altitude of 40 km on opposite sides of the lunar body. The penetrators were to have been braked by a small rocket at an altitude of 25 km, then free fall to the surface. They were designed to withstand a collision speed of 330 meters per second to deeply penetrate the lunar regolith. Once the penetrators are deployed, the LUNAR-A spacecraft was mission-planned to maneuver to an orbital altitude of 200 km above the lunar surface. The craft was to have carried a monochromatic imaging camera with a resolution of 30 m. It was to be Japan's first large scale lunar probe. (Hiten was a technology demonstrator and only had a camera and a dust counter)

Not only was LUNAR-A one of the first two missions of the original Lunar Exploration Program, it was supposed to be the first mission in the LUNAR series. However, the mission was delayed for years (the original launch date was in 1995), and from 2004, no launch date was set. The space craft was completed in 1997, but the development of the penetrators were severely delayed. The Project faced several other issues, including problems with the propellant and the thrusters. Worse, in 2006, JAXA decided to retire the M-V rocket, which the LUNAR-A planned to use. M-V-2, the rocket which was to be used for LUNAR-A couldn't be used anymore, because many portions of it were reused for other launches. The M-V-2 is now displayed in JAXA's Sagamihara Campus.

In January 2007, JAXA cancelled the LUNAR-A mission, mostly due to the fact that the space craft had become old. A follow-on mission known as LUNAR-B existed, but was merged into the SELENE series following LUNAR-A's cancellation. JAXA continued the research for the penetrators, and completed its development in October 2010, following a successful test fire. Russia's Luna-Glob1 plans to use four penetrators provided by JAXA. JAXA is also considering to have the SELENE-2 carry penetrators. Britain's BNSC once stated that they were interested in acquiring several Japanese penetrators for their MoonLITE probe.

SLIM

SLIM, short for Smart Lander for Investigating Moon, is a candidate for the SPRINT-C (Small scientific satellite Platform for Rapid INvestigation and Test-C) mission. The lander would be , and is proposed to be launched on an Epsilon advanced rocket from the Kagoshima Prefecture in late 2019.

The mission's main goal will be to perfect soft-landing technologies, including navigation relative to the surface, and detection of obstacles such as rocks and holes. The demonstration mission is estimated to cost about ¥15 billion (US$125 million).

See also

Exploration of the Moon
List of future lunar missions
Robotic exploration of the Moon
Hakuto

References

External links
 Official site of the Japanese Lunar Exploration Program (JSPEC)

Japanese Lunar Exploration Program
Missions to the Moon
Space program of Japan
Proposed spacecraft